Gabriel Janoušek (born 29 November 1940 in Turnov) is a Czechoslovak retired slalom canoeist who competed in the 1960s and 1970s.

Janoušek won three medals at the ICF Canoe Slalom World Championships with two silvers (C2: 1967, C2 team: 1967) and a bronze (C2 team: 1971). He also finished 11th in the C2 event at the 1972 Summer Olympics in Munich.

References

1940 births
Canoeists at the 1972 Summer Olympics
Czechoslovak male canoeists
Living people
Olympic canoeists of Czechoslovakia
Medalists at the ICF Canoe Slalom World Championships
People from Turnov
Sportspeople from the Liberec Region